Peter N. Detkin was a managing partner and 20% owner of Intellectual Ventures. He is currently the Managing Director of the Sherpa Technology Group.

Biography
He graduated from the University of Pennsylvania, with a B.S.E.E. in 1982 and J.D. in 1985. He worked as a patent attorney for Wilson Sonsini Goodrich & Rosati of Palo Alto, becoming a partner in 1992

Following this, he worked as Vice President and assistant general counsel in charge of patents, litigation, licensing and antitrust/competition law for Intel, and later became one of four founders of Intellectual Ventures. Detkin now allegedly owns approximately 20% of Intellectual Ventures Management Company, generating approximately $10-$20M annually in "management fees" for managing Intellectual Ventures Funds. This is ironic because Intellectual Ventures has been described as a "patent troll", and Detkin helped popularize this as a pejorative term while at Intel. Detkin and Intellectual Ventures were prominently featured in an episode of This American Life on patent issues.

He is an inactive member of the bars of California and New York, and licensed to represent inventors before the U.S. Patent Office.

Detkin serves on the Board of Overseers for University of Pennsylvania School of Engineering and Applied Science. He provided support for the Department of Electrical and Systems Engineering to build a new principle teaching laboratory, The Detkin Lab. He also contributed a gift to Penn Law School to establish an intellectual property and technology legal clinic, Detkin Intellectual Property and Technology Legal Clinic.

Detkin is active with the Law Foundation of Silicon Valley, serving as a Board Member and past-President.

Detkin is on the Board of Directors for the Humane Society of Silicon Valley (HSSV). His wife, Michelle Oates Detkin, is a retired attorney having worked in real estate law and in commercial law at Intel. Together they live in Los Altos with their adopted dog Chloe (an HSSV alum) and cats Joey and Danica (also HSSV alumni) and Blake. October 2021 HSSV announced that it received a $10 million multi-year investment from Michelle Oates Detkin and Peter Detkin to expand access to veterinary care, especially for families impacted by economic challenges. This was the largest financial commitment made to HSSV since its founding in 1929.

References
 

Living people
American patent attorneys
Year of birth missing (living people)
University of Pennsylvania School of Engineering and Applied Science alumni
University of Pennsylvania Law School alumni